Chris Burkett (born August 21, 1962) is a former professional American football player who was selected by the Buffalo Bills in the 2nd round of the 1985 NFL Draft. A 6'4", 198-lb. wide receiver from Jackson State, Burkett played in 9 NFL seasons for the Bills and the New York Jets from 1985 to 1993.

Burkett serves as the Executive Director for Big Brothers Big Sisters of Mississippi and is the founder and CEO of Chrisburkettsports.

References

1962 births
Living people
People from Laurel, Mississippi
Players of American football from Mississippi
American football wide receivers
Jackson State Tigers football players
Buffalo Bills players
New York Jets players